The Last Joke, Bellagio, also known as The Good Joke, is a black and white photograph taken by Alfred Stieglitz during a Summer travel to Italy in 1887. He was then living and studying in Germany and decided to travel through several cities of Italy at the Summer.

History and description
Stieglitz visited, among other places, Bellagio, on Lake Como, Lombardy, where he took several photographs, often depicting landscapes and folk scenes. This one was part of the group that he took while at Bellagio. The picture depicts a scene taken from the natural, without any artificiality, and depicts several children and youngsters of both genders laughing apparently at a joke that a woman in the fountain just said. It is closely cropped, focusing on the children, with architectural arches in the background providing a stage set for the image.

Stieglitz sent twelve photographs that he took during this travel to the magazine The Amateur Photographer's Photographic Holiday Work Competition. This picture appeared at the 25 November 1887 issue, and was considered the only spontaneous work in the competition, judged by British photographer Peter Henry Emerson, where it won the first prize.

Public collections
There are at least three prints of this photograph kept at the collections of the National Gallery of Art, Washington, D.C., the Museum of Modern Art, New York, and at a private collection.

References

1887 works
1887 in art
Black-and-white photographs
1880s photographs
Photographs by Alfred Stieglitz
Collections of the National Gallery of Art
Photographs of the Museum of Modern Art (New York City)